Robert Lee Russell (August 19, 1900 – January 18, 1955) was a United States circuit judge of the United States Court of Appeals for the Fifth Circuit and previously was a United States district judge of the United States District Court for the Northern District of Georgia

Education and career
Born in Winder, Georgia, Russell was the brother of Richard Russell Jr.  He was educated in Winder and attended the University of Georgia before leaving to study law in the office of his father, Richard Russell Sr.  He was admitted to the bar in 1920 and practiced in Atlanta as a partner in his father's firm from 1920 to 1923.  He was his father's secretary and law clerk during the elder Russell's service as Chief Justice of the Supreme Court of Georgia from 1923 to 1928, and then returned to private practice in Winder.

Federal judicial service
Russell was nominated by President Franklin D. Roosevelt on August 5, 1940, to the United States District Court for the Northern District of Georgia, to a new seat authorized by 54 Stat. 219. He was confirmed by the United States Senate on August 8, 1940, and received his commission on August 15, 1940. He served as Chief Judge in 1949. His service terminated on October 26, 1949, due to his elevation to the Fifth Circuit.

Russell was nominated by President Harry S. Truman on October 15, 1949, to a seat on the United States Court of Appeals for the Fifth Circuit vacated by Judge Samuel Hale Sibley. He was confirmed by the Senate on October 19, 1949, and received his commission on October 21, 1949. His service terminated on January 18, 1955, due to his death.

References

External links
 

1900 births
1955 deaths
People from Winder, Georgia
Judges of the United States District Court for the Northern District of Georgia
United States district court judges appointed by Franklin D. Roosevelt
20th-century American judges
Judges of the United States Court of Appeals for the Fifth Circuit
United States court of appeals judges appointed by Harry S. Truman
United States federal judges admitted to the practice of law by reading law